Sergeant Rutledge is a 1960 American Technicolor Western film directed by John Ford and starring Jeffrey Hunter, Constance Towers, Woody Strode and Billie Burke. Six decades later, the film continues to attract attention because it was one of the first mainstream films in the U.S. to treat racism frankly and to give a starring role to an African-American actor. In 2017 critic Richard Brody observed that "The greatest American political filmmaker, John Ford, relentlessly dramatized, in his Westerns, the mental and historical distortions arising from the country’s violent origins—including its legacy of racism, which he confronted throughout his career, nowhere more radically than in Sergeant Rutledge."

The film starred Strode as Sergeant Rutledge, a black first sergeant in a colored regiment of the United States Cavalry. At a U.S. Army fort in the early 1880s, he is being tried by a court-martial for the rape and murder of a white girl as well as for the murder of the girl's father, who was the commanding officer of the fort. The story of these events is recounted through several flashbacks.

Plot
The film revolves around the fictional court-martial of 1st Sgt. Braxton Rutledge (Strode) of the 9th U.S. Cavalry in 1881. At the time, the United States Army maintained four colored regiments, including the 9th Cavalry. His defense is handled by Lt. Tom Cantrell (Hunter), who is also Rutledge's troop officer. The story is told through a series of flashbacks, expanding the testimony of witnesses as they describe the events following the murder of Rutledge's Commanding Officer, Major Custis Dabney, and the rape and murder of Dabney's daughter Lucy, for which Rutledge is the accused.

Circumstantial evidence suggests that the first sergeant  raped and murdered the girl and then killed his commanding officer. Worse still, Rutledge deserts after the killings. Ultimately, he is tracked down and arrested by Lt. Cantrell. At one point, Rutledge escapes from captivity during an Indian raid, but later, he voluntarily returns to warn his fellow cavalrymen that they are about to face an ambush, thus saving the troop. He is then brought back in to face the charges and the prejudices of an all-white military court.
 
Eventually he is found not guilty of the rape and murder of the girl when a local white man, Chandler Hubble, breaks down under questioning and admits that he raped and murdered the girl.

Cast
 Jeffrey Hunter as 1st Lt. Tom Cantrell, 9th Cavalry (counsel for the defense). Hunter's role in Sergeant Rutledge was the last of his three roles in films directed by Ford. He was previously cast in The Searchers and The Last Hurrah.
 Willis Bouchey as Lt. Col. Otis Fosgate, 9th Cavalry (president of the court-martial)
 Billie Burke as Mrs. Cordelia Fosgate. Burke was a veteran actress who had played a good witch in The Wizard of Oz (1939); her part in Sergeant Rutledge was her final film role.
 Constance Towers as Mary Beecher. Towers had also been cast in Ford's previous film, The Horse Soldiers.
 Woody Strode as First Sergeant Braxton Rutledge, C Troop 9th US Cavalry. Sergeant Rutledge was the first of four films Strode made with John Ford. In an interview, Strode recalled how he was cast for the role: "The big studios wanted an actor like Sidney [Poitier] or [Harry] Belafonte," recalled Strode. "And this is not being facetious, but Mr. Ford defended me; and I don't know that this is going on. He said, "Well, they're not tough enough to do what I want Sergeant Rutledge to be."
 Juano Hernández as Sgt. Matthew Luke Skidmore, C Troop 9th US Cavalry
 Carleton Young as Capt. Shattuck, 14th Infantry (prosecutor)
 Judson Pratt as 2nd Lt. Mulqueen, 9th Cavalry (court-martial board member) (uncredited)
 Chuck Hayward as Capt. Dickinson, 9th US Cavalry.
 Rafer Johnson as Cpl. Krump, C Troop 9th US Cavalry
 Toby Michaels as Lucy Dabney (uncredited)
 Jack Mower as Courtroom Spectator (uncredited)
 Fred Libby as Chandler Hubble (uncredited)

Production & release
The screenplay for Sergeant Rutledge was original and was written by the film's co-producer, Willis Goldbeck, and by James Warner Bellah. Bellah has written that he and Goldbeck interested John Ford in directing a film after a screenplay was completed. Bellah had previously written the stories on which John Ford based his "cavalry trilogy" of films: Fort Apache (1948), She Wore a Yellow Ribbon (1949), and Rio Grande (1950). The screenplay for Sergeant Rutledge was subsequently adapted by Bellah for a novel of the same name.

Parts of the film were shot in Monument Valley and the San Juan River at Mexican Hat in Utah.

As illustrated in the poster image above, for the 1960 domestic theatrical release of the film the theater patrons were warned that they could not be seated during the final 10 minutes of the film in order to preserve its suspense. The film did poorly in U.S. theaters. Scott Eyman summarized: "Sergeant Rutledge is a film of considerable formal beauty about the bonds between a black band of brothers. Not surprisingly, it did miserably at the domestic box office, grossing $784,000. It did considerably better overseas, grossing $1.7 million, but was probably still a marginal financial failure."

Other countries
In Spain, the film was shown under the title of El Sargento Negro (The Black Sergeant), in France under the title Le Sergent Noir (The Black Sergeant) and in Italy under the title I dannati e gli eroi (The Damned and the Heroes).

Reception
Black Classic Movies mentions that this is one of the few American films of the 1960s to have a Black man in a leading role and the first mainstream western to do so. Lucia Bozzola at All Movie gave it four out of five stars and mentioned "the expressionistic use of light and color, particularly during Rutledge's encounter with a sympathetic female witness, points to the repressed sexual terror that drives the case against him" and praised Strode's performance. Jonathan Rosenbaum at Chicago Reader considered the film to be "effective", but "slightly long" and mentioned that it is "one of Ford's late efforts to treat minority members with more respect than westerns usually did." Time Out agreed that the film is "often pigeonholed as one of Ford's late trio of guiltily amends-making movies" and although it praised it, it concluded that "he can't confront the cultural fear of miscegenation that mechanises [the movie], only its distorted expression."

In Mike Grost's anthology presenting Ford's movies, the film was described as being one of his best, but also one of his most underrated. It also mentioned how the film mocked traditional femininity as being an "artificial construct". TV Guide said the film "is a fascinating, detailed look at racism" and mentioned how some characters are directly racist, while others suffer from "repressed racism". Variety said that the movie has an "intriguing screenplay which deals frankly, if not too deeply, with racial prejudice in the post-Civil War era." The Movie Scene was more mixed, saying it is an "interesting movie because it is slightly different to what you expect from a John Ford western", but mentioned that it "is not the intelligent courtroom drama of say Anatomy of a Murder", but that it instead relies on Ford's customary use of the flashback.

Home media
A region 1 DVD was released in 2006 in the United States as part of a set of movies directed by John Ford. In 2016 the film's DVD was released individually. A VHS tape had been released in 1988.

See also

 Military history of African Americans
 Racism
 Expressionism in Cinema

References

Further reading 
 
 
 
 
 
 
  Rated "B" on an A-F scale.

External links

 . 
 . 
 
 
 

1960 films
1960s English-language films
1960 Western (genre) films
American Western (genre) films
Western (genre) cavalry films
Films about racism in the United States
Films directed by John Ford
Films set in the 1880s
Films shot in Utah
Military courtroom films
Warner Bros. films
Revisionist Western (genre) films
1960s historical films
American historical films
1960s American films
Films shot in Monument Valley